Koru is a symbol in Maori art.

Koru or KORU may also refer to:

Places 
Koru, Yalova, a town in Turkey
Goris, a town in Armenia also known as Koru
Koru, Kenya, a village in Kenya
Koru Uppalapadu, a village in India
Colusa, California, a town in California also known as Koru

Other uses 

KORU, an American radio station in Saipan, Northern Mariana Islands
KJSR, an American radio station in Tulsa, Oklahoma, which had the call sign KORU from 1966 to 1972
Koru (Ankara Metro), a metro station
Koru (yacht), a luxury superyacht being constructed for Jeff Bezos

People with the name 
Kōru Abe (born 1994), Japanese shogi player
Fehmi Koru (born 1950), Turkish journalist
Şevki Koru (1913–2003), Turkish long-distance runner

See also 
Korus (disambiguation)